Rhode Vanessa Dalzon (born November 1, 1996) is a Haitian journalist and author. She is the editor-in-chief of the online newspaper Balistrad.

Biography
Dalzon was born in Port-au-Prince, (Haiti) in a Christian family.
She studied Law at Quisqueya University. She is the author of the novel Opération-Rupture, a column published in Balistrad for 22 weeks. Dalzon divides her time away from the office between writing, reading, singing, and television shows.

See also
 List of Haitians

References

External links
 Balistrad 
 Muck Rack

Living people
1996 births
Haitian journalists
People from Port-au-Prince
Quisqueya University alumni